Attulus floricola is a species of jumping spider (family Salticidae) with a Palearctic distribution. They are typically  in length. Females are dark reddish brown, with an almost black anterior.

Formerly, it was placed in the genus Sitticus and then from 2017 to 2020 in the genus Calositticus.

Habitat and ecology
The species lives in bogs, marshes, fen and meadows, on the heads of plants like Eriophorum vaginatum (cotton grass) or similar, on which the spiders occasionally spin their cocoons. In Britain, they can be found from March to September.

References

Spiders described in 1837
Sitticini
Palearctic spiders